Yuri Nikolaevich Sakharov (18 September 1922 – 26 September 1981) was a Ukrainian Chess Master (1958), International Correspondence Chess Master (1971), and Merited Coach of the Ukrainian SSR (1963).

Biography 
Yuri Sakharov was born on 18 September 1922 in Yuzovka (now Donetsk). His father was an official in the Donbas mining industry. In 1937 during the Great Purge he was arrested and executed. Yuri Sakharov became a "son of an enemy of the people." During the Great Patriotic War the Nazis sent him to work in a Belgian coal mine. When Allied Forces entered Belgium, Yuri Sakharov joined the US Army and fought against the Nazis. He earned a Purple Heart Medal. When his unit reached the Elbe in 1945, he was repatriated.

Back home in Ukraine, he got a job as an Inspector in Kiev.

In 1951 he brilliantly won the Semi Final USSR Chess Championship in Lvov and was qualified together with Lev Aronin and Vladimir Simagin who tied up the second and third places to participate in the XIX USSR Chess Championship in Moscow. Also, he fulfilled the norm requirement of Chess Master. But very soon he was arrested by denunciation and his Chess Master Title was revoked. Lev Aronin, Vladimir Simagin, and Salomon Flohr were qualified from Lvov and went to Moscow.

Sakharov faced a closed-door trial, and he was given 25 years of jail in Vladimir Central Prison.

After Stalin's death in 1953, mass amnesty of the victims of Stalin's repressions  started. In 1955 Yuri Sakharov was offered amnesty too, but he refused insisting on full rehabilitation. In 1956 he eventually was freed on full rehabilitation. His father was rehabilitated, too (posthumously).

Sakharov rebuilt his chess career. When he was 46, he became the 17th highest rated player in the world.

He tragically died in 1981 in Kiev. The circumstances of his death remains unknown.

Chess career 
Sakharov was the champion of Kiev in 1948 and in 1949, and shared 1-2 place with A. Kofman in 1947 (8.5/13) and with V.Shianovsky in 1961 (8/12).

Sakharov was twice the Ukrainian Champion in 1966 and 1968. He participated in 19 Ukrainian Championships, tying for 4-6th in 1946 (Anatoly Bannik won), tying for 3rd-4th in 1947 (Alexey Sokolsky won), tying for 6-9th in 1949 (Isaac Lipnitsky won), taking 5th in 1951 (Bannik won), taking 2nd, behind Efim Geller, in 1958, tying for 4-5th in 1959 (Geller won), sharing 1st with Leonid Stein but lost to him a match for the title (+1 −3 =2) in 1960, tying for 3rd-4th in 1961 (Yuri Kots won), taking 3rd in 1962 (Stein won), and tying for 2nd-3rd in 1964 (Bannik won).

Yuri Sakharov played in the Ukrainian team during Soviet Team Chess Championships.

Twice Sakharov became the Champion of the Ukrainian Voluntary Sports Society "Avangard" in 1962 (11.5/15) and 1964 (8.5/13).

He played for the "Avangard" Team during Soviet Team Chess Cup Tournaments.

He participated in the USSR Chess Championships 5 times.

He was a winner of International Chess Tournament in Varna in 1968 and made the first norm for a title of International Master.

Yuri Sakharov successfully played in friendly international matches both for the USSR and Ukraine.

Yuri Sakharov was part of the Soviet Team that won gold in Chess Correspondence Olympiad VI of 1968-72 and VII of 1972-76.

He earned the title of International Correspondence Chess Master (IMC) in 1971.

Honors 
As a chess player
 Winner of the 9th Championship of Trade Unions in Leningrad, now Saint Petersburg  (1971) 
 Winner of the International Tournament in Varna (1968)
 USSR Chess Championships Participant (5): 1960, 1964/65, 1965(7 place), 1967(6 place), 1968/69
 Ukrainian Chess Championship Winner(2): 1966, 1968
 Championship of Sports Society "Avangard" Winner(2): 1962, 1964
 Kiev Chess Championship  Winner(4): 1947 (1-2), 1948, 1949, 1961 (1-2)
 Stalino (now Donetsk) Region Championship Winner(2): 1940, 1946

References

External links
 

1922 births
1981 deaths
Soviet chess players
Ukrainian chess players
Merited Coaches of Ukraine
20th-century chess players